"Casper", also known as 11 Rabbit, (August 8, 422 – 487?), was an ajaw of the Maya city of Palenque from August 9, 435 to 487. He was the immediate successor of K'uk' Bahlam I, who founded the ruling dynasty.

Casper came to power in August 435 at the age of 13 and ruled the city for 52 years. Only Pacal the Great is recorded to have ruled Palenque longer.

Notes

Sources

External links
 "Casper II": Complete List of Text References in Who's Who in the Classic Maya World by Peter Mathews Foundation for the Advancement of Mesoamerican Studies, Inc. (FAMSI)

422 births
Rulers of Palenque
5th-century monarchs in North America
Year of death unknown
5th century in the Maya civilization